Matterhorn is a  mountain summit located in Wallowa County, Oregon, US.

Description

Matterhorn is located 10 miles south-southwest of Joseph, Oregon, in the Wallowa Mountains. It is set within the Eagle Cap Wilderness on land managed by Wallowa–Whitman National Forest. The peak is situated 1.8 mile west-northwest of Craig Mountain, 1.5 mile west of Ice Lake and 1.24 mile south of line parent Sacajawea Peak. The peak ranks as the second-highest peak in the Wallowa Mountains, and the seventh-highest summit in Oregon. It was once considered to be the highest in the Wallowas, before Sacajawea Peak was determined to be a few feet higher. Precipitation runoff from the mountain drains west into Hurricane Creek and east into Adam Creek, both of which are tributaries of the Wallowa River. The peak is composed of limestone of the Martin Bridge Formation. This landform's toponym has been officially adopted by the United States Board on Geographic Names. It is so named because of a likeness to the famous Matterhorn on the Swiss–Italian border, and the name has been in use since at least 1926.

Climate

Based on the Köppen climate classification, Matterhorn is located in a subarctic climate zone characterized by long, usually very cold winters, and mild summers. Winter temperatures can drop below −10 °F with wind chill factors below −20 °F. Most precipitation in the area is caused by orographic lift. Thunderstorms are common in the summer.

Gallery

See also
 List of mountain peaks of Oregon

References

External links

 Weather forecast: Matterhorn
 Matterhorn (photo): Flickr

Mountains of Oregon
Mountains of Wallowa County, Oregon
North American 2000 m summits
Wallowa–Whitman National Forest